Jasbir Singh (born 14 March 1950) is a former Indian cricketer and umpire. He stood in six ODI games between 1994 and 2000. He played 37 first-class matches for Northern Punjab and Punjab from 1964 to 1977 before making his umpiring debut in 1990.

See also
 List of One Day International cricket umpires

References

External links

1950 births
Living people
Indian cricket umpires
Indian One Day International cricket umpires
Cricketers from Amritsar
Indian cricketers
Northern Punjab cricketers
Vazir Sultan Tobacco cricketers
Punjab, India cricketers